Greater Iqbal Park, formerly Minto Park, is an urban park located in the outskirts of the Walled City in Lahore, Pakistan. Before current renovations and expansion, its name was Iqbal Park.

Noted as the home of Minar-e-Pakistan, the 329-acre park includes an artificial lake which spreads over four acres which includes an 800-feet-long musical fountain. Other attractions includes a two-kilometre-long soft rail, a library, an open-air gym and a food court. The tombs of Allama Iqbal and Hafeez Jalandhari are also located in the park.

History 
The grounds known as Greater Iqbal Park today were used for ceremonial military parades during the Mughal era. After the ascension of the Sikhs into power in 1799, the grounds came to be known as 'Parade Ground', as the area continued to be used for the same purpose as it was by the Mughals.

When the British captured Lahore in 1849, they renamed the grounds as Minto Park, after Gilbert Elliot-Murray-Kynynmound, 1st Earl of Minto, and Governor-General of India between July 1807 and 1813.

After the creation of Pakistan, the park was renamed as Iqbal Park, after the poet-philosopher Muhammad Iqbal, in commemoration of the Lahore Resolution of 1940. After extensive renovations were completed in December 2016, the park was given its current name.

Renovation and expansion 
Work began on the upgradation of the park on 10 October 2015. Habib Construction Services Limited was contracted to complete the project. Along with renovation of the Minar-i-Pakistan, the project featured expansion of the Iqbal Park by including it in the stretch of Circular Road between the park and Lahore Fort.
The 125-acre green oasis is surrounded almost entirely by the old city of Lahore. The project was completed on 9 November 2016 incurring a total cost of PKR 981 million as quoted by the contractor of the project.

The new-look park was formally inaugurated on 17 December 2016.

Furthermore, the National History Museum was opened in the park in 2018. It is the first digital museum in Pakistan that offers an immersive experience to visitors with the help of cutting-edge technologies. Using holograms and virtual reality equipment, this digital museum commemorates all the historic events leading to the emergence of Pakistan in 1947. Along with hosting a vast collection of national relics and antiquities, the museum also highlights the key sports and cultural events throughout the history of the country.

Features 
The park features the following sites:

 Minar-e-Pakistan
 Tomb of Hafeez Jalandhari
 Tomb of Allama Iqbal
 Musical fountain
 National History Museum
 Library
 Boating lake
 Mughal-style baradari
 Children play area
 Food court
 Open-air gym
 Walking trails
 Buggy track
 Gazebos

Gallery

See also 

 List of parks and gardens in Pakistan
 List of parks and gardens in Lahore
 List of parks and gardens in Karachi

References 

Lahore
Tourist attractions in Lahore
Walled City of Lahore
Memorials to Muhammad Iqbal
Parks in Lahore
Gardens in Pakistan